Stopped on Track is a 2011 German drama film directed by Andreas Dresen. It premiered in the Un Certain Regard section at the 2011 Cannes Film Festival. The film won the Prize Un Certain Regard, the top award for best film in the section. The win was shared with the South Korean film Arirang, directed by Kim Ki-duk.

Plot
The 44-year-old family man Frank Lange has a proper job and lives with his wife Simone and their children Lilly and Mika in a modern serial house when he learns he suffers with an inoperable brain tumour and has only but a short time left. Supported by his family he uses an iPod to keep daily records of his decline. Radiation therapy and chemical treatment take their toll on him. Eventually he grows too weak to leave the house and has hallucinations during which his tumour seems to appear as a vain actor in a late-night talk show hosted by Germany's established TV presenter  Harald Schmidt. His children are increasingly overstrained and so is his wife Simone. The tumour deprives Frank from memory, orientational ability and even control of basic body functions. Fighting the pain with always stronger doses of morphium he loses his true personality and finally his speech. Having become a nursing case of the highest degree he dies at last in his home amidst his family. When actually everybody  is lost for words, his daughter Lilly, an ambitious diver, utters: "I have to attend training".

Cast
Milan Peschel as Frank
Steffi Kühnert as Simone
Mika Seidel as Mika
Talisa Lilli Lemke as Lilly
Otto Mellies as Frank's father Ernst
Christine Schorn as Frank's mother
Ursula Werner as Simone's mother
Marie Rosa Tietjen as Simone's sister
Harald Schmidt as himself

Reception

Accolades
Rated as Besonders wertvoll (English: "Especially valuable") by Deutsche Film- und Medienbewertung 
2012 Deutscher Filmpreis

References

External links
 

2011 films
German drama films
2010s German-language films
2011 drama films
Films directed by Andreas Dresen
2010s German films